The 2018 season was the Los Angeles Chargers' 49th in the National Football League, their 59th overall, their third in the Greater Los Angeles Area and their second under head coach Anthony Lynn.

Despite a slow 1–2 start, the Chargers improved on their 9–7 record from the previous year with a Week 14 win over the Cincinnati Bengals. They also recorded a 10-win season for the first time since 2009 when they were in San Diego, also their first as a Los Angeles based team since 1960. With a Week 15 win over the Kansas City Chiefs, the Chargers clinched their first playoff berth since 2013 when they were based in San Diego.

The Chargers finished 12–4, tied with the Chiefs for both the AFC West division title and the best record in the AFC. However, the Chiefs won the division and the AFC's No. 1 seed based on record vs. division opponents (5–1 to 4–2), giving the Chargers the Wild Card and the AFC's No. 5 seed. The Chargers defeated the Baltimore Ravens 23–17 in the Wild Card round, but lost to the eventual Super Bowl champion New England Patriots 41–28 in the Divisional round. The season would prove to be their last where all of their games were played outdoors.

Offseason

Roster Changes

Signings

Departures

Draft

 
 
 
 
 

Draft trades
The Chargers traded their seventh-round selection (234th overall) to Buffalo in exchange for quarterback Cardale Jones.
The Chargers were awarded a seventh-round compensatory pick (251st overall).

Staff

Final roster

Preseason

Regular season

Schedule
On January 11, the NFL announced that the Chargers would play host to the Tennessee Titans in one of the London Games at Wembley Stadium in London, England. It was the Chargers' second appearance in the International Series; the other being 2008. The game occurred during Week 7 (October 21), and was televised in the United States.

The Chargers' regular season schedule was released on April 19.

Note: Intra-division opponents are in bold text.

Game summaries

Week 1: vs. Kansas City Chiefs

Week 2: at Buffalo Bills

Week 3: at Los Angeles Rams

Week 4: vs. San Francisco 49ers
Philip Rivers passed John Elway for eighth-most passing yards in NFL history.

Week 5: vs. Oakland Raiders

Week 6: at Cleveland Browns

Week 7: vs. Tennessee Titans
NFL London Games

Week 9: at Seattle Seahawks

Week 10: at Oakland Raiders

Week 11: vs. Denver Broncos

Week 12: vs. Arizona Cardinals

Week 13: at Pittsburgh Steelers

Week 14: vs. Cincinnati Bengals

Week 15: at Kansas City Chiefs

Week 16: vs. Baltimore Ravens
Philip Rivers eclipsed 4,000 yards at the same time as Tom Brady, becoming the third and fourth quarterback in NFL history to reach 4,000 yards in 10 seasons or more, joining Peyton Manning and Drew Brees.

Week 17: at Denver Broncos

Standings

Division

Conference

Postseason

AFC Wild Card Playoffs: at (4) Baltimore Ravens

The Chargers recorded six sacks, jumped out to a 23–3 lead and halted a late Ravens rally, forcing Lamar Jackson to fumble on the final drive to earn a trip to New England.

On the Ravens' second possession of the game, Chargers defensive end Melvin Ingram forced a fumble from Kenneth Dixon that was recovered by safety Adrian Phillips, giving Los Angeles the ball on the Baltimore 14-yard line. Three plays later, Michael Badgley kicked a 21-yard field goal to give Los Angeles a 3–0 lead. Then the Chargers' defense forced a punt, which Desmond King returned 42 yards to the Ravens' 42-yard line, setting up a 53-yard Badgley field goal that increased their lead to 6–0. Early in the second quarter, Phillips intercepted a pass from Jackson to give the Chargers a first down on the Ravens' 44-yard line. From there, they drove 27 yards to go up 9–0 on Badgley's third field goal. Following another Ravens punt, Los Angeles drove 53 yards in 12 plays to score on Badgley's fourth field goal on the last play of the half, giving them a 12–0 lead.

King returned the second half kickoff 72 yards to the Ravens' 35-yard line, but this time the Chargers failed to score when Badgley's field goal attempt was blocked by Za'Darius Smith. After a Ravens punt, linebacker Patrick Onwuasor forced a fumble from Chargers tight end Virgil Green that was recovered by linebacker C. J. Mosley on the Los Angeles 21-yard line. This set up Justin Tucker's 33-yard field goal, cutting the score to 12–3 with 8:34 left in the third quarter. At the end of Los Angeles' next possession, the Ravens got another scoring opportunity when Javorius Allen blocked Donnie Jones's punt, resulting in Baltimore taking over on the Chargers' 40-yard line; they only managed to gain 4 yards with their next three plays and Tucker's 50-yard field goal attempt was wide right. Los Angeles then drove 60 yards in 10 plays, featuring a 28-yard completion from Philip Rivers to Mike Williams on the Ravens' 15-yard line. On the next play, Melvin Gordon ran the ball 14 yards to the 1-yard line. The Ravens managed to keep Los Angeles out of the end zone for the next three plays, but Gordon scored with a 4th down 1-yard touchdown run on the first play of the 4th quarter; Rivers completed a pass to Williams for a two-point conversion, giving the Chargers a 20–3 lead.

A sack by Ingram on the Ravens' ensuing drive forced them to punt from their 14-yard line and Sam Koch's 31-yard kick gave the Chargers good field position on the Ravens' 45-yard line. Los Angeles then drove 16 yards, including a 9-yard scramble by Rivers on 3rd-and-8, to score on Badgley's 5th field goal, from 47 yards, that gave them a 23–3 lead. Taking the ball back with 9:02 left, Baltimore drove 75 yards in eight plays, including Jackson's 29-yard completion to Willie Snead on 4th-and-11. On the next play, Jackson threw a 31-yard touchdown pass to receiver Michael Crabtree, making the score 23–10. The Chargers recovered Baltimore's ensuing onside kick attempt, but still had to punt after three plays. Baltimore went on to drive 85 yards in 12 plays, the longest a 39-yard completion from Jackson to Dixon. On the last play, Jackson threw a 6-yard touchdown pass to Crabtree, narrowing their gap to 23–17 with 2:06 left. Baltimore then forced a punt with 45 seconds to go, giving them one last chance to drive for a winning touchdown, but Chargers linebacker Uchenna Nwosu forced a fumble while sacking Jackson and Ingram recovered it to give Los Angeles the victory.

Rivers completed 22-of-32 passes for 160 yards and rushed for 15 yards. Ingram finished the game with seven tackles (two for a loss of yards), two sacks, a forced fumble and a fumble recovery. Phillips had five tackles (three solo), an interception and a fumble recovery. King returned a kickoff for 72 yards and had four punt returns for 46 yards. Jackson completed 14-of-29 passes for 194 yards, with two touchdowns and an interception; he was also Baltimore's leading rusher with 9 carries for 54 yards. Onwausor had seven tackles (six solo), a sack and a forced fumble.

AFC Divisional Playoffs: at (2) New England Patriots

New England piled up 347 yards in the first half and scored touchdowns on five of their first six possessions to defeat the Chargers, which sent the Patriots to the AFC championship game for the eighth consecutive season.

The Patriots started the game by driving 83 yards in 14 plays, scoring on Sony Michel's 1-yard touchdown run. Chargers quarterback Philip Rivers quickly led his team right back, completing an 18-yard pass to Mike Williams on 3rd-and-15 before tying the game on a 43-yard touchdown completion to Keenan Allen. New England then drove 67 yards in 7 plays, the longest a 28-yard completion from Tom Brady to receiver Julian Edelman. On the next play, Michel ran 14 yards to the end zone to give the Patriots a 14–7 lead with less than a minute left in the first quarter.

Los Angeles had to punt after three plays and Edelman returned it 6 yards to the Patriots' 42-yard line. Then he caught passes for gains of 11 and 17 yards as New England drove 58 yards to take a 21–7 lead on Brady's 15-yard touchdown pass to receiver Phillip Dorsett. Following another Chargers punt, Brady completed a 25-yard pass to running back James White on New England's first play. A few plays later, Michel took off for a 40-yard run to the Chargers' 9-yard line, where Rex Burkhead took the ball to the end zone over the next two plays, the second a 6-yard touchdown run to put the Patriots up 28–7. The next time New England got the ball, they were forced into a three-and-out, but Chargers returner Desmond King muffed their punt and Albert McClellan recovered it for the Patriots on the Chargers' 35-yard line. Brady then started the ensuing possession with a 19-yard completion to Edelman, while Michel finished it with his third touchdown run, a 5-yard carry, that put the team up 35–7 with 1:40 left in the half. They nearly scored again after forcing a Los Angeles punt, but Dorsett was tackled on the Chargers' 30-yard line as time expired.

In the first half alone, Brady completed 23-of-29 passes for 233 yards and a touchdown, Michel had 16 carries for 105 yards and three touchdowns, White caught 10 passes for 71 yards, and Edelman caught 7 passes for 107 yards while also returning 3 punts for 31 yards.

Los Angeles had to punt on their opening drive of the second half and Brady's 25-yard completion to tight end Rob Gronkowski set up a 28-yard Stephen Gostkowski field goal, increasing New England's lead to 38–7. This time the Chargers were able to respond, as Williams caught 3 passes for 40 yards as the team drove 72 yards in 10 plays to score on Melvin Gordon's 1-yard touchdown run, cutting the score to 38–14. But Los Angeles' defense still could not contain New England, as Brady's completions to Edelman and White for gains of 35 and 23 yards lead to another Gostkowski field goal, giving the Patriots a 41–14 lead with 12:27 left.

Following a few punts, Rivers completed passes to Tyrell Williams and Allen for gains of 29 and 32 yards as the team drove to score on his 1-yard touchdown pass to tight end Virgil Green. Then he completed a pass to Allen for a two-point conversion, making the score 41–22 with 7:28 left. After failing to recover an onside kick, the Chargers forced a punt, but Patriots defensive back Stephon Gilmore ended their following drive with an interception. By the time Los Angeles got the ball back, only three minutes remained, which they used to drive 80 yards in 12 plays to score on Rivers' 8-yard pass to tight end Antonio Gates, making the final score 41–28 following a failed two-point conversion attempt.

Brady completed 34-of-44 passes for 343 yards and a touchdown. Edelman caught 9 passes for 131 yards and returned 5 punts for 37 yards, moving to second place all-time in playoff receptions, behind only Jerry Rice. White tied an all-time playoff record with 15 receptions for 97 yards. Michel ran 24 times for 129 yards and three touchdowns, and caught a pass for 9 yards. Rivers finished the day 25-of-51 for 331 yards, three touchdowns and an interception. Tyrell Williams was his top receiver with 5 receptions for 94 yards.

With this win, Tom Brady improved his record against Rivers to 8–0 (counting regular season and playoff games). It would also prove to be Rivers' last playoff game as a Charger.

Down judge Sarah Thomas became the first woman to officiate an NFL postseason game and second woman to officiate a postseason game in one of the four major North American professional sports leagues, following the NBA’s Violet Palmer.

References

External links
 

Los Angeles Chargers
Los Angeles Chargers seasons
Los Angeles Chargers
Chargers